"Harder, Better, Faster, Stronger" is a song by French duo Daft Punk, released in October 2001 as the fourth single from their second studio album Discovery. A live version of "Harder, Better, Faster, Stronger" was released as a single from the album Alive 2007 on 15 October 2007. This version won a Grammy Award for Best Dance Recording in 2009. In October 2011, NME placed it at number 132 on its list "150 Best Tracks of the Past 15 Years".

Composition
"Harder, Better, Faster, Stronger" is built around a "bouncy" keyboard riff sampled from the 1979 track "Cola Bottle Baby" by the funk musician Edwin Birdsong. In 2016, Birdsong said: "I recorded ['Cola Bottle Baby'] 30 years ago, and here come some guys from France. I asked them, 'Where did you find the music?' And they said, 'I was going through bins and it popped out.' ... I'm blessed and I continue to be blessed by opening my arms to God every day." The track also features vocoded vocals. It is set in the key of F minor.

Reception 
In 2016, Daniel Jeakins wrote for HuffPost: "For all the gifts electronic deities Daft Punk have bestowed upon pop music, no track feels quite as iconic or ingenious as 'Harder Better Faster Stronger' ... Fifteen years on from its release and it’s hard to think of a dance track that’s as prominent in popular culture or influential to modern electronic music." In 2021, Billboard ranked the song number two on its list of the 20 greatest Daft Punk songs.

Music video
The animated music video for "Harder, Better, Faster, Stronger" was produced by Daft Punk and directed by Kazuhisa Takenouchi, director for Toei Animation, under the supervision of Leiji Matsumoto. It features the four characters shown on the single cover in a vast electronic facility. There, they are prosthetically and cosmetically changed by various machines to resemble humans. The video was first released as an individual episode in promotion for the single release. It later appeared as a scene in the feature film Interstella 5555: The 5tory of the 5ecret 5tar 5ystem.

A music video for the live version of "Harder, Better, Faster, Stronger" was directed by Olivier Gondry. It contains footage shot by the audience on 250 cameras at Daft Punk's Brooklyn performance in KeySpan Park (now called Maimonides Park) in Coney Island. The video was inspired by the Beastie Boys concert film Awesome; I Fuckin' Shot That!. The video had its world premiere online on 26 October 2007, at Webcastr.

Live performances 
A live version of "Harder, Better, Faster, Stronger" was recorded at Bercy in Paris from 14 June 2007. It was released as a download single on 15 October 2007, for the live album Alive 2007. The track also contains a part of the "Television Rules the Nation / Crescendolls" segment of the Bercy performance that features elements of the songs "Around the World", "Steam Machine", "Television Rules the Nation". This version of the song won the Grammy Award for Best Dance Recording at the 51st Grammy Awards.

Other versions
Diplo released a remix of "Harder, Better, Faster, Stronger" titled "Work Is Never Over". It appeared in his compilation album Decent Work for Decent Pay. The title of the song was also parodied in an episode of The Cleveland Show called '"Harder, Better, Faster, Browner", which was a part of season two. Neil Cicierega used the "Harder, Better, Faster, Stronger" instrumental, along with Smash Mouth's songs "Walkin' on the Sun" and "All Star", for the mashup "Daft Mouth" as part of Cicierega's Mouth Sounds album.

Philippe Uminski of the band Circus released a cover version of "Harder, Better, Faster, Stronger" in 2004. Mike Tompkins released an a cappella version of the song in May 2012.

Kanye West's song "Stronger" from the album Graduation prominently features a sample of "Harder, Better, Faster, Stronger". Two actors who wore the robotic Daft Punk costumes in the film Daft Punk's Electroma appear in the music video for "Stronger". It was performed live at the 50th Annual Grammy Awards with Daft Punk in their trademark pyramid while West was on stage rapping. Daft Punk member Guy-Manuel de Homem-Christo said that "Stronger" was "not a collaboration in the studio, but the vibe of the music we do separately connected in what [West] did with the song". He later clarified that the live version was "truly a collaboration from the start. We really did it all hand in hand."

Norwegian YouTube singer Per Fredrik Pellek Asly, or "PelleK", released a power metal version of the song in July 2013. Steam Powered Giraffe covered the song in May 2014.

Usage in media
The television show Grey's Anatomy used the title of the song for the one of episodes seen in season fourteen. The song was used both in Ben 10 and in the theatrical trailer for the Disney animated film Ralph Breaks the Internet.

The song was used as part of a task for contestants to complete in the UK Big Brother television series 10. It was performed by Sophie and Rodrigo.

Daft Hands 
"Harder, Better, Faster, Stronger" is featured in the 2007 YouTube viral video Daft Hands, which shows a pair of hands moving to reveal each word of the song's lyrics. The video was performed by Austin Hall, who later appeared on The Ellen DeGeneres Show. In 2010, Time magazine included Daft Hands in a list of "YouTube's 50 Best Videos". The video inspired numerous remakes including the variant Daft Bodies; both videos, along with other viral videos, were referenced in Weezer's "Pork and Beans" music video.

Track listing

Charts

Original version

2007 live version

Weekly charts

Year-end charts

Certifications

References

External links

2001 singles
2001 songs
2007 singles
Animated music videos
Daft Punk songs
Grammy Award for Best Dance Recording
Live singles
Songs written by Guy-Manuel de Homem-Christo
Songs written by Thomas Bangalter
Virgin Records singles